Sneaker is the debut album by the band Sneaker. It was released in 1981 on Handshake Records.

It contains the hit single, "More Than Just the Two of Us" (U.S. #34, AC #17). Although the song became more popular in the Philippines.

Track listing

Production 
Producer: Jeff Baxter
Engineer: Larold Rebhun
Management & direction: Shelly Weiss
Additional engineering: Al Schmitt, Wayne Neuendorf, Jeff Baxter
Assistant engineers: Clif Jones, Sheridan Eldridge, John Hanlon, Krohn McHenry, Karen Siegel
Recorded at Village Recorder & Cherokee Studios
Mastered at Bernie Grundman Mastering, Hollywood
Mastering: Bernie Grundman
Production coordinator: Marylata Kastner
Photography: Sam Emerson
Illustrations: Susan McDonnell
Design: Tommy Steele/Art Hotel

Personnel 
Michael Cottage - bass, background vocals
Mitch Crane - guitars, lead and background vocals
Mike Hughes - drums, background vocals
Jim King - keyboards, synthesizers, vibes
Michael Carey Schneider - lead and background vocals, keyboards
Tim Torrance - guitars

Guest artists 
 "Don't Let Me In": Jeff Baxter - guitar solos on fade
 "Jaymes": Ed Greene - drums, John Raymond - bass, David Foster - clavinet, Lon Price - saxophone solo, Bobby LaKind - percussion (courtesy Warner Bros. Records)
 "One By One": David Woodford - saxophone solo
 "No More Lonely Days": Jeff Baxter - guitar solos on fade, Sherlie Mathews, Paulette Brown, Cleopatra Kennedy - background vocals, Jimmie Haskell - string and French horn arrangements

References

1981 debut albums
Sneaker (band) albums